The blue-capped redstart (Phoenicurus coeruleocephala) is a species of bird in the family Muscicapidae.

It is found in most of the Himalayas and the northern parts of the Indian Subcontinent, with its range extending across Tajikistan and Afghanistan into India, from Jammu & Kashmir eastwards across Himachal Pradesh and Uttaranchal, to Nepal and Bhutan, and further east to Arunachal Pradesh and adjoining regions.

Its natural habitat is temperate forests.

References

blue-capped redstart
Birds of Nepal
Birds of North India
Birds of Pakistan
Birds of Afghanistan
Birds of Central Asia
Birds of Western China
blue-capped redstart
Taxonomy articles created by Polbot